Li Junhui (born 10 May 1995) is a Chinese former badminton player. He was the gold medalist at the 2018 World Championships in the men's doubles event partnered with Liu Yuchen, two times won the gold medal at the Asian Championships in 2017 and 2018, and was a silver medalist at the 2020 Summer Olympics. Li was part of the national team that won the 2018 Asian Games, 2018 Thomas Cup, and 2019 Sudirman Cup.

Career 

Li competed at the 2020 Summer Olympics. Partnered with Liu Yuchen, he finished as a silver medalist in the men's doubles, having been defeated by Lee Yang and Wang Chi-lin of Chinese Taipei in the final.

In November 2021, Li announced his retirement from professional badminton citing injuries he had sustained and not fully recovered from since 2017.

Achievements

Olympic Games 
Men's doubles

BWF World Championships 
Men's doubles

Asian Games 
Men's doubles

Asian Championships 
Men's doubles

BWF World Junior Championships 
Boys' doubles

Asian Junior Championships 
Boys' doubles

BWF World Tour (3 titles, 4 runners-up) 
The BWF World Tour, which was announced on 19 March 2017, and implemented in 2018, is a series of elite badminton tournaments sanctioned by the Badminton World Federation (BWF). The BWF World Tour is divided into levels of World Tour Finals, Super 1000, Super 750, Super 500, Super 300 (part of the HSBC World Tour), and the BWF Tour Super 100.

Men's doubles

BWF Superseries (2 titles, 3 runners-up) 
The BWF Superseries, which was launched on 14 December 2006, and implemented in 2007, was a series of elite badminton tournaments, sanctioned by the Badminton World Federation (BWF). BWF Superseries levels were Superseries and Superseries Premier. A season of Superseries consisted of twelve tournaments around the world that had been introduced since 2011. Successful players were invited to the Superseries Finals, which were held at the end of each year.

Men's doubles

  BWF Superseries Finals tournament
  BWF Superseries Premier tournament
  BWF Superseries tournament

BWF Grand Prix (6 titles, 2 runners-up) 
The BWF Grand Prix had two levels, the Grand Prix and Grand Prix Gold. It was a series of badminton tournaments sanctioned by the Badminton World Federation (BWF) and played between 2007 and 2017.

Men's doubles

  BWF Grand Prix Gold tournament
  BWF Grand Prix tournament

BWF International Challenge/Series (1 runner-up) 
Men's doubles

  BWF International Challenge tournament
  BWF International Series tournament

References

External links 
 
 

1995 births
Living people
Sportspeople from Anshan
Badminton players from Liaoning
Chinese male badminton players
Badminton players at the 2020 Summer Olympics
Olympic badminton players of China
Olympic silver medalists for China
Olympic medalists in badminton
Medalists at the 2020 Summer Olympics
Badminton players at the 2018 Asian Games
Asian Games gold medalists for China
Asian Games bronze medalists for China
Asian Games medalists in badminton
Medalists at the 2018 Asian Games
World No. 1 badminton players